The 2011–12 season will be BFC Siófok's 19th competitive season, 2nd consecutive season in the OTP Bank Liga and 80th year in existence as a football club.

First team squad

Transfers

Summer

In:

Out:

Winter

In:

Out:

List of Hungarian football transfer summer 2011
List of Hungarian football transfers winter 2011–12

Statistics

Appearances and goals
Last updated on 27 May 2012.

|-
|colspan="14"|Youth players

|-
|colspan="14"|Players currently out on loan

|-
|colspan="14"|Players no longer at the club

|}

Top scorers
Includes all competitive matches. The list is sorted by shirt number when total goals are equal.

Last updated on 27 May 2012

Disciplinary record
Includes all competitive matches. Players with 1 card or more included only.

Last updated on 27 May 2012

Overall
{|class="wikitable"
|-
|Games played || 38 (30 OTP Bank Liga, 2 Hungarian Cup and 6 Hungarian League Cup)
|-
|Games won || 13 (9 OTP Bank Liga, 1 Hungarian Cup and 3 Hungarian League Cup)
|-
|Games drawn || 10 (9 OTP Bank Liga, 0 Hungarian Cup and 1 Hungarian League Cup)
|-
|Games lost || 15 (12 OTP Bank Liga, 1 Hungarian Cup and 2 Hungarian League Cup)
|-
|Goals scored || 40
|-
|Goals conceded || 50
|-
|Goal difference || -10
|-
|Yellow cards || 79
|-
|Red cards || 4
|-
|rowspan="1"|Worst discipline ||  Vilmos Melczer (7 , 1 )
|-
|rowspan="7"|Best result || 2–0 (H) v Újpest FC - OTP Bank Liga - 30-07-2011
|-
| 3–1 (H) v Kaposvári Rákóczi FC - OTP Bank Liga - 20-08-2011
|-
| 2–0 (A) v Zalaegerszegi TE II - Hungarian Cup - 21-09-2011
|-
| 2–0 (H) v Kaposvári Rákóczi FC - Hungarian League Cup - 08-11-2011
|-
| 3–1 (H) v Lombard-Pápa TFC - OTP Bank Liga - 26-11-2011
|-
| 2–0 (H) v Paksi SE - OTP Bank Liga - 17-03-2012
|-
| 2–0 (H) v Zalaegerszegi TE - OTP Bank Liga - 12-05-2012
|-
|rowspan="1"|Worst result || 0–7 (A) v Videoton FC - OTP Bank Liga - 19-11-2011
|-
|rowspan="1"|Most appearances ||  Tamás Kecskés (30 appearances)
|-
|rowspan="1"|Top scorer ||  Vilmos Melczer (9 goal)
|-
|Points || 50/114 (43.86%)
|-

Nemzeti Bajnokság I

Matches

Classification

Results summary

Results by round

Hungarian Cup

League Cup

Matches

Classification

Pre Season (Winter)

References

External links
 Eufo
 Official Website
 UEFA
 fixtures and results

BFC Siófok seasons
Hungarian football clubs 2011–12 season